The Athenian Treasury (Greek: Θησαυρός των Αθηναίων) at Delphi was constructed by the Athenians to house dedications and votive offerings made by their city and citizens to the sanctuary of Apollo. The entire treasury including its sculptural decoration is built of Parian marble. The date of construction is disputed, and scholarly opinions range from 510 to 480 BCE. It is located directly below the Temple of Apollo along the Sacred Way for all visitors to view the Athenian treasury on the way up to the sanctuary.

Pausanias mentions the building in his account of the sanctuary, claiming that it was dedicated from the spoils of the Battle of Marathon, fought in 490 BCE against the Persians. The Battle of Marathon can be seen in some of the images of the metopes which compare their victory to mythology. By using the founder of Athens, Theseus, to show the victories of Athens, the treasury established Athens as one of the most powerful, polis, city-states of Greece. According to archeological records, the Athenian treasury metopes display the earliest known presence of Theseus in a large-scale sculpture. Prior to this treasury, Theseus had been depicted on vase paintings, but never before on architecture. Although Herakles was also depicted in the metopes, the added heroic character showed the Athenian's increasing devotion to Theseus. The pairing of the two heroes was a metaphor alluding to the Battle of Marathon.

The metopes show Athenian identity and how they viewed their enemies both foreign or domestic. Several other city-states built treasuries in the panhellenic site of Delphi.

Among other firsts, the Athenian treasury was also the first Panhellenic sanctuary that was dedicated by Athenians.

The building was excavated by the French School at Athens, led by Pierre de La Coste-Messelière, and reconstructed from 1903 to 1906. The structure is still visible in situ, although the metopes are reproductions; the originals are kept in the museum of Delphi.

Mythology and the metopes 

The main characters of the metopes are from common Athenian mythology showing these heroes undergo their many trials. The metopes show Theseus, the mythological founder and king of Athens. His mother, though human, was possessed by Poseidon at the time of conception. The labors of Theseus began in order to claim the throne as he travels through the six entrances to the underworld. Each labor is depicted in the form of a metope, his strength metaphorically showing Athenian prowess on the international stage that was Greece at the time.

Herakles at the time was the second most mentioned and decorated hero to appear in Athens. Athens wanted to be seen as related not just to their own personal hero Theseus but connect him to Herakles as a relation to the gods. Each metope contains a single deed done by each hero as they tried to reach their goal. This put the polis-hero on equal level to Herakles even including a later version of Theseus that occurred after 460 BCE when Theseus used his club against Periphetes making him look very similar to Herakles. The metopes also draw parallels between the two heroes with the bull to which Herakles captured as his seventh labor from Crete which later Theseus captures and sacrifices to Apollo/Athena.

Metopes

The thirty metopes of the treasury are 67 cm tall and 62–64 cm wide, nine along the long sides (north and south) and six along the short (east and west), depicted the labors of Theseus and Herakles. This is the earliest surviving juxtaposition of the two. Many of these metopes were found in the surrounding area and it is disputed on the order to which they would have appeared.

Theseus was the mythical king of Athens and its founder.

Thesean metopes include:
 Theseus and Athena
 Theseus and Sinis
 Theseus and the Crommyonian sow
 Theseus and Sciron
 Theseus and Cercyon
 Theseus and Procrustes
 Theseus and the Bull of Marathon
 Theseus and the Minotaur
 Theseus and the Captive Amazon

Heraklean metopes include:
 Heracles and the Nemean Lion
 Heracles and the Ceryneian Hind
 Heracles and the Centaur
 Heracles and Cycnus
 Heracles and Orthrus
 Cows of Geryon (three metopes)
 Geryon

Inscription
The platform upon which the treasury stands has a prominent inscription on its south face; it is dated internally to post-490 BCE.

ΑΘΕΝΑΙΟΙ Τ[Ο]Ι ΑΠΟΛΛΟΝ[Ι ΑΠΟ ΜΕΔ]ΟΝ ΑΚ[ΡΟΘ]ΙΝΙΑ ΤΕΣ ΜΑΡΑΘ[Ο]ΝΙ Μ[ΑΧΕ]Σ.

The Athenians dedicated this to Apollo as first-fruits from the Persians at the Battle of Marathon.

Construction 

The Athenian Treasury in Delphi was built according to a typical distyle in antis design, with two antae framing two columns.

The ancient writer and traveler Pausanias was “emphatic that the Athenian Treasury was built [meaning financed] from the spoils from the landing of the Persian general Datis at Marathon”. This means that a date later than 490 BCE, after the Battle of Marathon and accounting for time of construction would be acceptable to Pausanias.

Despite being a primary source, Pausanias on occasion may have been misguided or misinformed, and classical scholars still maintain the great date debate. John Boardman notes that “on a purely archaeological, architectural and stylistic grounds the Treasury has appeared to many scholars to date around 500 BCE, and some would put it earlier.”

Recent findings compiled by University of Chicago professor Richard T. Neer, referencing excavations from 1989 (summarized by Pierre Amandry in 1998), advocates for the later date:A ledge of 0.30 meters in width projects from the Treasury’s stereobate along its south side only, and that this ledge helps to support the Marathon base. In other words, the plan of the Treasury takes the base into account from the earliest phase of construction. The two structures are thus integral, and both must date after the battle of Marathon in 490 BCE. With this archaeological datum, the chronology of the Athenian treasury must be considered settled. Pausanias was correct.It is debated to have an earlier construction date due to the late archaic style used for the architecture. The Doric style was modeled after the use of wood to create structures. The paintings inside the treasury were dated back to the 480's BCE making specialists believe construction started before the military win.

Votive offerings 
The treasury was made to contain votive offerings such as spoils of war and Kouros. This is where the famous twin kouros statues, Kleobis and Bition,  were found. They were originally made at the Temple of Athena in Argos, but were given to the Athenian Treasury as a mark of respect. Due to Athens being a super power at the time, many city-states paid them for protection. The treasury was not only an offering to the gods, but a statement of their power showing off armors, statuettes, and other pottery. The treasury was also a statement about the wealth of their new government. After transitioning from a tyrant ruled city-state into a democracy, the Athenians sought to internationally display their increased military success, wealth and prosperity.

Votive offerings were often given after a great win, a prayer, or a funeral piece. These offerings were given by all Greeks to the gods in a sign of worship. Having separate treasuries allowed Athens to show more of their prominent victories and achievements, establishing their identity as a people and also to show the rest of Greece that they were elites in the hierarchy.

The Battle of Marathon 
The Battle of Marathon occurred in 490 BCE between the Persians and the Athenians. It was a decisive blow against Persia during the first Greco-Persian War. After the battle, the spoils of war were used to either create or upgrade the treasury and store many of the other spoils as gifts to the gods. The metope of Theseus and the Bull of Marathon shows how the Athenians tried to tie the win to their divine right to be the head polis and rule over the others. This also tied their mythology more closely to their reality.

Role at a Panhellenic Sanctuary 
This treasury held and displayed the votive offerings dedicated to the god Apollo at Delphi. The amount of dedications given would determine the power, range, and existence of the god. The treasury would house and protect the most durable offerings and also precious offerings that could withstand time. The Athenian Treasury is one of the more elaborate treasuries to show the prosperity of Athens. The dedications belonged to Apollo and were not allowed to leave the sanctuary. The offerings stay within the temenos but were buried in votive pits once they were found to no longer be practical to display. The offerings would get more elaborate with the status of the Athenians, especially after winning a war in which they thought Apollo had showed them favor. A panhellenic sanctuary was open for all of the city-states. The Athenians took this chance to display their civic pride and prosperity to not only the other city-states but to the gods and show them that they deserved their favor.

The site of Delphi 

It is important to note the historical and geographical importance of the area in which the Athenian treasury is located. The Athenians, Siphnians, and the Sikyonians each had their own treasury lining the pathway to the Temple of Apollo, at the site of Delphi. The geographical location of the Temple of Apollo was significant in Greek mythology as it was the destination where two eagles, placed at opposite ends of the earth by Zeus, met.

This temple was considered an oracle, where Apollo could communicate to humans through the Pythia. The Greeks, their leaders and other foreign leaders journeyed to the temple of Apollo seeking advice from the Pythia, despite misinterpretations often leading to twists in fate.

Much like the Olympics today, the site of Delphi hosted the Pythian Games as a dedication to Apollo, in the site's Greek theater. As well as athletic competitions, the Pythian Games also held poetry, dance and music contests, drawing in spectators and crowds. The presence of the oracle and the Pythian Games, allowed the Athenians to showcase their treasury on an international scale.

See also
 Siphnian Treasury

References

External links 

 Michael Scott. "Delphi: The Bellybutton of the Ancient World". 39:56 minutes. BBC 4.

Ancient Greek buildings and structures in Delphi
Battle of Marathon
Votive offering
Buildings and structures in Central Greece
Culture in Classical Athens